American Industrial Ballads is a studio album by American folk singer Pete Seeger. It was released in 1956 by Folkways Records. It was reissued in 1992 by Smithsonian Folkways.

Album
Seeger sings songs of struggle which emerged from the coal mines, textile mills and acres of farmland, and spoke of issues important to the American laborer. There are twenty-four songs, written about the unprecedented industrialization of the 19th century, including "Peg and Awl", "The Farmer is the Man", and "Winnsboro Cotton Mill Blues". Irwin Silber's notes provide a history of labor folk song and its role in American popular music. The cover design for the 1992 reissue was done by Carol Hardy.

Critical reception

Writing for Allmusic William Ruhlman wrote "Seeger presents the songs straightforwardly with only occasional flourishes, intent on getting the meanings across." He continued, "Taken together, they chronicle a century and a half of the efforts of farmers, textile workers, and miners, primarily, to get what they deserve from increasingly rich and powerful captains of industry."

Track listing

References

1957 albums
Pete Seeger albums
Folkways Records albums